Firkins is a surname. Notable people with the surname include:

 Christine Firkins (born 1983), Canadian teacher and actress
 Michael Lee Firkins (born 1967), American guitarist
 Seth Firkins (1981–2017), American audio engineer
 Tim Firkins (born 1948), American politician